Squadron Leader Simon Brailsford was Equerry to Queen Elizabeth II between 1998 and 2001. He was a career Royal Air Force officer, specialising as a navigator. He was promoted to Squadron Leader 1 January 1997, and was later promoted to Wing Commander and Group Captain.

References

Equerries
Royal Air Force officers
Living people
Year of birth missing (living people)